is a Japanese sci-fi light novel series written by Mizuhito Akiyama with illustrations by Eeji Komatsu that centers on the relationship between Kana Iriya, a high school girl who has to fight alien invaders, and Naoyuki Asaba, a member of the school newspaper club and one of her few friends. There were four light novels published by MediaWorks under their Dengeki Bunko imprint; the series was once nominated for the Seiun Award. Later, a six-episode original video animation adaptation was created based on the novels; the DVDs were released in Japan between February 25 and July 29, 2005. Two sound novel video games for the Nintendo DS were released in Japan; the first in January 2007 and the second in October 2007. A manga series illustrated by Tōko Kanno was serialized in ASCII Media Works' seinen manga magazine Dengeki Maoh between the October 2007 and March 2009 issues.

Plot
Iriya no Sora, UFO no Natsu is a story revolving around a secret war that has been going on below the public's eye since 1947 and a group of people involved in the war, either directly or indirectly. The main protagonist is a young high school student named Naoyuki Asaba who, on the last day of summer break, sneaks into the school at night to swim in secret. However, upon arrival at the pool, he meets the mysterious Kana Iriya, who is there for the same reason. However, she doesn't know how to swim, so Naoyuki offers to teach her how to swim. During this private lesson, a group of people show up in search of Kana and take her back to the nearby air force base where she is staying.

The next day, Naoyuki is surprised to find that Kana joins his class as the new term begins. Eventually, both of them take a liking to each other and Naoyuki even gets her to join the school newspaper club. Little does Naoyuki know that Kana is in fact an expert fighter pilot engaged in a war between humans and aliens that has been going on since the Kenneth Arnold incident on June 24, 1947. The whole world's fate rests in the hands of Kana Iriya and if she can ultimately hold off the invasion in the final battle.

Characters

The main character, Naoyuki is usually a relatively quiet boy who spends time with his close friends most of the time. His parents own a hair salon, and Naoyuki himself is able to cut hair. A member of the school newspaper club, he spent the previous summer keeping a watch out for UFOs near a local military base with the club's chairman for company. At the beginning of the school year, he meets the new transfer student, Kana Iriya, and quickly forms a crush on her. Naoyuki usually tries his best to be assertive when needed, but is also very sensitive and cries several times throughout the series.

Kana is a very mysterious girl who transfers into Naoyuki's class at the beginning of the school term at the end of the summer vacation. She tends to have very little social skills and rarely talks to anyone. In effect, most of her classmates dislike her rude attitude and avoid her most of the time. The truth is, however, that she is humanity's last hope at defeating alien invaders from completely annihilating the human race. To save mankind, she is forced to pilot the "Black Manta", a super advanced fighter jet with astounding maneuverability, with which she often fights the invaders. However, by flying the Black Manta, Iriya's mind and body are constantly under incredible strain causing her to often bleed frequently, especially from her nose. Soon after meeting Naoyuki at school, she quickly develops a crush on him and because of this, she joins the school newspaper club to be with him. She places various objects in his footlocker on the days that she is present at school.

Akiho is one of Naoyuki's classmates and has known Asaba long enough to have developed a crush on him. At first, she dislikes Kana and excludes her from club activities, but after an eating contest where they both overeat and get sick they finally become friends.

He is the chairman of the Sonohara Wave Press otherwise known as is the school newspaper club. He is always filled with energy and is very loud because of it. He refers to the other members of the club as "Special Correspondents" and often gets very in to his work. Also, he is relatively knowledgeable about computers as once he was able to listen in on Naoyuki's and Kana's conversation when they were on a date together. In the novels, it is mentioned that he is actually quite good in both studies and sports; his record for running the 100 meter dash is eleven seconds.

Supposedly Kana's older brother, he is an older man who is more or less in charge of Kana and is very protective of her. Usually he tends to be a very care-free type of person, though can sometimes be driven to be very violent, especially when Kana is concerned.

She is Enomoto's colleague, who is also connected with protecting Kana at all costs. She impersonates the school nurse at Naoyuki's school in order to keep an eye on Kana, though she really does seem to have some knowledge about medicine. Also, she can be a very violent person and once brutally fought with Naoyuki after they had a talk about Kana. Mayumi Shiina is not her real name, which remains unknown; the initials of her true name, as seen in her letter to Naoyuki, is "T.S.".

Naoyuki's younger sister who is in junior high school. She tends to be very loud and annoying to her older brother and does not back down easily. When Naoyuki went on a date with Kana, Yūko ended up following and spying on them, which is probably because she was interested in finding out who Kana was. After the spying, she got into a fight with Suizenji.

Naoyuki's classmate, who often hangs out with him.

Naoyuki's homeroom teacher.

Media

Light novels
The light novel series of Iriya no Sora is written by Japanese author Mizuhito Akiyama and illustrated by Eeji Komatsu, also known for his work on Planetarian: The Reverie of a Little Planet. The series was four volumes in length and published by MediaWorks under their Dengeki Bunko label. Eventually, the series was nominated for the Seiun Award. The Chinese translation is published by Kadokawa Media.

List of chapters

Original video animation
A six-episode original video animation series based on the novels was produced by the animation studio Toei Animation. The OVAs were released as six DVDs between February 25 and July 29, 2005. Five of the DVD titles are taken from the chapter titles of the novels. The OVA's opening theme was "Forever Blue" and the ending theme was "Himawari", both sung by Chihiro Imai.

Episodes

Video games
A sound novel and card game video game for the Nintendo DS based on the series was released in Japan on January 11, 2007 by MediaWorks. A sequel named Iriya no Sora, UFO no Natsu II was released on October 25, 2007. On the same day the second game came out, a bundle pack containing the two games went on sale.

Manga
A manga adaptation for the series was serialized in ASCII Media Works' seinen manga magazine Dengeki Maoh between the October 2007 and March 2009 issues. Two tankōbon volume of the manga were released between June 27, 2008 and April 27, 2009 under ASCII Media Works' Dengeki Comics imprint. The manga's artist, Tōko Kanno, is also the artist of the manga adaptation of Oku-sama wa Mahō Shōjo: Bewitched Agnes.

References

External links
Video games official website 
OVA official website 

2001 Japanese novels
2005 anime OVAs
2007 manga
2007 video games
Anime and manga based on light novels
ASCII Media Works manga
Dengeki Bunko
Dengeki Comics
Kadokawa Dwango franchises
Light novels
MediaWorks games
Nintendo DS games
Nintendo DS-only games
Science fiction anime and manga
Shōnen manga
Visual novels
Toei Animation original video animation
Video games developed in Japan